Cercophis is a genus of snake in the family Colubridae  that contains the sole species Cercophis auratus. It is called Schlegel's golden snake.

It is found in Suriname and Brazil.

References 

Dipsadinae
Monotypic snake genera
Reptiles described in 1837